Durgapur is an upazila of Rajshahi District in the Division of Rajshahi, Bangladesh.

Geography
It has a total area of 195.03 km².

Demographics

According to the 2011 Bangladesh census, Durgapur Upazila had 48,530 households and a population of 185,845, 15.1% of whom lived in urban areas. 7.7% of the population was under the age of 5. The literacy rate (age 7 and over) was 48.2%, compared to the national average of 51.8%.

Administration
Durgapur has 7 Unions/Wards, 114 Mauzas/Mahallas, and 122 villages. Post Code- 6240.

See also
Upazilas of Bangladesh
Districts of Bangladesh
Divisions of Bangladesh

References

Upazilas of Rajshahi District

ru:Дургапур (город, Раджшахи)